Tony Óg Regan (born 14 November 1983) is an Irish sportsperson. He plays hurling with his local club Rahoon-Newcastle and with the Galway senior inter-county team.

Tony Og won a minor All Ireland Final with Galway in 2000 beating Cork, while he was on the team that lost to Cork in 2001. He progressed to Under 21 where he lost finals in 2002 to Limerick and 2003 to Kilkenny. Following winning an All Intermediate Final in 2002, Regan made his senior championship debut for Galway in 2003 and played in the All Ireland Finals of 2005 and 2012 (draw and replay). Regan  won National League medals with Galway in 2004 and 2010, while he was also on the first Galway team to win a Leinster championship in 2012.

Regan was nominated for three all star awards in 2005, 2010 and 2012.

References
 Tony Óg Regan on Hurlingstats.com
 Galway GAA honours

1983 births
Living people
Rahoon-Newcastle hurlers
Galway inter-county hurlers